"When You Love Someone" is a song performed by British singer and songwriter James TW. The song was released as a digital download on 19 August 2016 by Island Records as the lead single from his second extended play First Impressions (2016).

Live performances
On 23 January 2017, James TW performed "When You Love Someone" on The Ellen DeGeneres Show.

Context
James TW explained in a 1:12 minute YouTube video that he came up with the song during the time he was teaching some children to play musical instruments. He found out that the parents of one of the children he was teaching were getting divorced. The child was 11 years old at the time, and James thought that he would write a song showing how the parents would explain to their son in a way he would understand, and put in a positive way the separation of a child's parents. James wanted a song that his music student and other children passing through a similar situation could listen to, to give them hope and make them realise that "what happened in life was perhaps for the best".

Music video
A music video to accompany the release of "When You Love Someone" was first released onto YouTube on 19 February 2016 at a total length of three minutes and forty-six seconds.

Track listing

Charts

Weekly charts

Year-end charts

Certifications

Release history

References

2016 songs
2016 singles
James TW songs
Island Records singles